Diaprograpta is a genus of spiders in the family Miturgidae. It was first described in 1909 by Simon. , it contains 5 species from different areas of Australia.

References

Miturgidae
Araneomorphae genera
Spiders of Australia